Contemporary Concepts is an album by pianist and bandleader Stan Kenton with featuring performances of jazz standards recorded in 1955 and released on the Capitol label.

Reception

The Allmusic review by Scott Yanow noted "The music swings well (with drummer Mel Lewis pushing the rhythm section) and such talented soloists as altoists Charlie Mariano and Lennie Niehaus, tenor-saxophonist Bill Perkins, trombonist Carl Fontana, and trumpeters Sam Noto and Stu Williamson are well-featured. Nothing all that innovative occurs but this accessible set should be of interest to fans of bop".

Track listing
 "What's New?" (Bob Haggart, Johnny Burke) - 5:43
 "Stella by Starlight" (Victor Young, Ned Washington) - 5:11
 "I've Got You Under My Skin" (Cole Porter) - 5:30
 "Cherokee" (Ray Noble) - 3:06
 "Stompin' at the Savoy" (Benny Goodman, Chick Webb, Edgar Sampson, Andy Razaf) - 4:36
 "Yesterdays" (Jerome Kern, Otto Harbach) - 5:37
 "Limelight" (Gerry Mulligan) - 3:08
 "Sunset Tower" (Stan Kenton) - 3:11 *bonus track on CD
 "Opus in Chartreuse" (Gene Roland) - 2:33 *bonus track on CD
 "Opus in Turquoise" (Gene Roland) - 2:54 *bonus track on CD
 "Opus in Beige" (Gene Roland) - 2:26 *bonus track on CD

Personnel
Stan Kenton - piano, conductor
Bobby Clark, Ed Leddy, Sam Noto, Al Porcino, Stu Williamson - trumpet
Gus Chappell, Bob Fitzpatrick, Carl Fontana, Kent Larsen - trombone 
Don Kelly - bass trombone
Charlie Mariano, Lennie Niehaus - alto saxophone
Bill Perkins, David van Kriedt - tenor saxophone
Don Davidson - baritone saxophone
Ralph Blaze  - guitar
Max Bennett - bass
Mel Lewis - drums
Bill Holman (tracks 1–6), Gerry Mulligan (track 7) - arranger

References

Stan Kenton albums
1955 albums
Capitol Records albums
Albums conducted by Stan Kenton